The South American qualification tournament for the 2012 Women's Olympic Volleyball Tournament was held from May 9 to May 13, 2012.

Venue
 Ginásio Milton Olaio Filho, São Carlos, São Paulo, Brazil

Preliminary round
All times are BRT (UTC−03:00).

Pool A

Pool B

Final round

Championship

Semifinals

Third place

First place

Final standing

Individual awards
MVP: 
Best Scorer: 
Best Spiker: 
Best Blocker: 
Best Server: 
Best Digger: 
Best Setter: 
Best Receiver: 
Best Libero:

External links
 Official website of the 2012 South American Olympic Qualification Tournament

Olympic Qualification Women South America
Volleyball qualification for the 2012 Summer Olympics
2012 in women's volleyball
Vol